William H. Raymond (May 30, 1844 – December 7, 1916) was an American soldier who fought with the Union Army in the American Civil War. Raymond received his country's highest award for bravery during combat, the Medal of Honor, for actions taken on July 3, 1863 during the Battle of Gettysburg.

Medal of Honor citation

Personal life
Raymond had three children with Olive A. Raymond following the war. He moved to Washington D.C. in 1900 when he was appointed a clerk in the census bureau.

References

External links
William H. Raymond on Find A Grave

1844 births
1916 deaths
American Civil War recipients of the Medal of Honor
People from Monroe County, New York
People of New York (state) in the American Civil War
Burials at Arlington National Cemetery
United States Army Medal of Honor recipients